Artur Kotenko (born 20 August 1981) is a retired Estonian professional footballer who last played as a goalkeeper for FCI Levadia.

Kotenko announced his retirement from professional football in November 2022.

Club career

Career in Estonia
On 24 October 2004, Kotenko scored Levadia's second goal against Tulevik in the penultimate round of 2004 Meistriliiga. The team won the match 4–1 and secured the title, ultimately making it the league winning goal.

Having been frozen out of the Levadia side in 2007, after refusing to sign a contract extension with the club (a similar fate was suffered by teammates Konstantin Vassiljev and Ats Purje earlier that season), Kotenko joined the Norwegian First Division side Sandnes Ulf, but was free to leave the club after less than a year because of a relegation release clause in his contract. In December 2008, Kotenko underwent a successful two-week trial at the English Championship side Nottingham Forest and was expected to join the club in January. The deal, however, fell through when Colin Calderwood was sacked following a boxing day defeat to Doncaster Rovers.

Viking
On 6 February 2009, he joined Eliteserien club Viking. The Estonian goalkeeper made his league debut for the Dark Blues more than eight months after the signing, on 25 October 2009. It ended after just 25 minutes, as he was sent off for handling the ball outside the 18-yard box.

AEP Paphos
On 10 June 2010, he signed a 1-year deal with Cypriot team AEP Paphos, with an option to extend it by another year, joining compatriot Ats Purje. He failed to make an impact there and only appeared in 7 league matches.

Ravan Baku
After an spell in Cyprus, Kotenko moved to Azerbaijan and joined a newly promoted Ravan Baku on a two-year contract. He made the debut on 6 August, in a 2–3 defeat against Kapaz. The contract was mutually terminated in October 2011.

Jaro
On 20 January 2012, Kotenko signed 1-year deal with Finish Veikkausliiga club Jaro.

Dnepr Mogilev
On 26 February 2013, Kotenko signed a 1-year contract with Belarusian club Dnepr Mogilev. After a successful season in Dnepr Mogilev, Artur Kotenko moved to bronze medalist Shakhtyor Soligorsk.

Shakhtyor Soligorsk 
On 3 May 2014, Kotenko became Belarus Cup winner. His great performance helped Shakhtyor Soligorsk to win bronze medals of Belarus premier league and reach play-off round of Euro League where Shakhtyor Soligorsk lost to PSV Eindhoven. Artur Kotenko have played 29 games in the Belarus premier league and made 17 clean sheets. On 13 December 2014, Artur Kotenko was awarded by Belarus Football Association as a best goalkeeper of Belarus premier league 2014.

Back in Estonia
On 8 February 2017, Kotenko signed for Estonian top tier club Narva Trans. After two seasons with Trans Kotenko signed for rival Meistriliiga club FCI Levadia. During his first season in Levadia he was mainly used as a backup for the national team first choice goalkeeper Sergei Lepmets. However, on May 18 2020, Lepmets unexpectedly announced his decision to retire from professional football, after which Kotenko was placed in charge of first team goalkeeping duties.

International career
He played for Estonia national football team 27 times between 2004–2013. His last call-up was in October 2020.

Honours

Club
Levadia
Meistriliiga: 2004, 2006, 2007
Estonian Cup: 2003–04, 2004–05, 2006–07
Estonian Supercup: 2001

Shakhtyor Soligorsk
Belarusian Cup: 2013–14

References

External links
 
 
 
 
 
 Interview for russian sports site (Russian)

1981 births
Living people
Footballers from Tallinn
FCI Levadia Tallinn players
FC Lantana Tallinn players
Estonian footballers
Estonia international footballers
Estonian expatriate footballers
Expatriate footballers in Finland
Estonian expatriate sportspeople in Finland
Expatriate footballers in Norway
Estonian expatriate sportspeople in Norway
Meistriliiga players
Eliteserien players
Veikkausliiga players
Cypriot First Division players
Viking FK players
Expatriate footballers in Cyprus
Estonian expatriate sportspeople in Cyprus
AEP Paphos FC players
Estonian expatriate sportspeople in Azerbaijan
Expatriate footballers in Azerbaijan
Ravan Baku FC players
Expatriate footballers in Belarus
Estonian expatriate sportspeople in Belarus
FC Dnepr Mogilev players
KSK Vigri Tallinn players
Sandnes Ulf players
FF Jaro players
FC Shakhtyor Soligorsk players
JK Narva Trans players
FC Puuma Tallinn players
Association football goalkeepers